Alex Clarke may refer to:

 Alex Clarke (Australian footballer) (born 1907), Australian rules footballer
 Alex Clarke (netball) (born 1977), Australian retired netball player
 Alex Clarke (rugby union) (born 1981), rugby union player for London Scottish

See also
 Alex Clark (disambiguation)